Yulianne Rodríguez Cruz (born August 12, 1982) is a women's basketball player from Cuba. Playing as a forward she won the gold medal with the Cuba women's national basketball team at the 2003 Pan American Games in Santo Domingo, Dominican Republic. Actualmente juega para el equipo de baloncesto femenino Quetzales Sajoma Club, en la liga profesional Mexicana.

References
FIBA Profile

1982 births
Living people
Cuban women's basketball players
Pan American Games gold medalists for Cuba
Pan American Games medalists in basketball
Basketball players at the 2003 Pan American Games
Forwards (basketball)
Medalists at the 2003 Pan American Games